Gyeryong is a city in southeastern South Chungcheong province, South Korea. The current mayor is Choi Hong-Mook. The city was created in 2003, by a split from Nonsan city, following prolonged local agitation.

Located on the outskirts of the city is a large military complex known as Gyeryongdae (Hangul: 계룡대), which is home to the headquarters of the Republic of Korea Armed Forces branches. Due to the city's proximity to Gyeryongdae, approximately half (47%) of its inhabitants are connected to the military, as service personnel and their dependents or as civilian employees. The city hosts several major Korean and international military conferences. From 1989 to 1993, the headquarters relocated from various locations in Seoul into the more spacious newly-built integrated complex. The Army and Air Force headquarters first moved there in 1989, followed by the Navy headquarters four years later.

Gyeryong Mountain, adjacent to the city, is considered the mountain with the most qi (spiritual energy) in Korea. It is also the heart of Gyeryongsan National Park. As of December 2020, the total population of the city was 42,822.

Modern history
Gyeryong city is one of the newest cities except for new cities near Seoul. The establishment as a city was made in 2003, when it broke from Nonsan.

According to data, Gyeryong city and surrounding area were called  "Yeonsan-Gun" in 1896. After Japanese colonization, it was incorporated to Nonsan. Later Gyeryong was chosen as the site for military. In 1989, Military and army headquarters, Gyeryongdae, moved to Gyeryong City. In 1991, it was designated as special area by president. The congress voted and decided via a special legislative bill that Gyeryong city be established
on June 30, 2003. Six months later, the city officially came out.

The area currently called Gyeryong city was known to be Shindoan among the older residents. Gyeryong is also known to be a satellite city of Daejeon due to its geographical closeness.

Climate
Gyeryong has a humid continental climate (Köppen: Dwa), but can be considered a borderline humid subtropical climate (Köppen: Cwa) using the  isotherm.

Economy
Pelicana Chicken has its headquarters in the city. 

Due to the proximity of Gyeryongdae, the Republic of Korea Armed Forces and Ministry of National Defense are major employers.

Transportation

Train 
The Honam Line goes through the Gyeryong station east to west. The KTX passes through 5 times a day, and many Saemaeul-ho and Mugunghwa-ho trains passes through the station.

Roads 
The Honam Expressway Branch passes through the city, exiting through Gyeryong IC. National Route 1 and National Route 4 pass through the city center.

Sister City 

  Jeungpyeong County
  Havana La Havana Cuba

See also
List of cities in South Korea
Geography of South Korea
Military of South Korea

References

External links
City government website 

 
Cities in South Chungcheong Province